Bor is a rural locality (a village) in Nikolo-Ramenskoye Rural Settlement, Cherepovetsky District, Vologda Oblast, Russia. The population was 51 as of 2002. There are 2 streets.

Geography 
Krasny Dvor is the nearest rural locality.

References 

Rural localities in Cherepovetsky District